Ether One is a first-person adventure game developed by British independent company White Paper Games. It was the studio's debut game and was originally released for Microsoft Windows on 25 March 2014. A PlayStation 4 edition was released on 5 May 2015.

In Ether One, the player assumes the role of a "Restorer", whose job is to investigate the thoughts of Jean Thompson, a 69-year-old woman diagnosed with dementia. The player must reconstruct Thompson's memories using three-dimensional simulations of the details she can remember in the town of Pinwheel, solving puzzles that become more obtuse throughout the gameplay, as the patient's thoughts continue to grow more unstable.

Ether One took around three years to complete and was released to positive critical reception, particularly for its atmosphere and immersive themes, while its narrative divided critics. The game's portrayal of dementia in the Jean Thompson character was also praised by numerous critics, such as The New Yorker and Kotaku.

Gameplay
Ether One is a first-person exploration game with optional puzzle solving. The player is cast as a "Restorer", an individual with the ability to project himself into the mind of someone suffering from mental illness in the hopes of restoring their memories. The game takes roughly five hours to complete.

After the game's premise is introduced to the player, the town of Pinwheel (the game's central location) is opened up to the player. The player must collect red bows tied to objects. A broken reel projector on the floor indicates a puzzle; once a puzzle has been solved, the memory it represents can be played back. Puzzles may involve physical tasks, such as completing a shipment of cider, while others are more mentally labouring in nature. The puzzles become more difficult and obtuse throughout the game, simulating the chaos and difficulty of a person suffering from dementia.

The player can also teleport at any point to a hub area, a virtual room where objects (picked up in memories) can be stored. These objects often have little-to-no relevance to the game's plot, and also tie in with the game's portrayal of dementia. The room allows the player to access the main areas of the patient's past and collect memories from these areas; the player is "never sure" of what is important and what is not, meaning they are encouraged to take everything.

Plot
The player assumes the role of a "Restorer", an employee of a futuristic memory-retrieval company called the Ether Institute of Telepathic Medicine. The Restorer is tasked with investigating the thoughts of Jean Thompson, a 69-year-old woman diagnosed with dementia, and retrieving her lost memories. The Institute is able to generate 3D simulations of damaged memories, and the Restorer must reconstruct them using the remaining pieces of those memories. The project is led by Dr. Phyllis Edmunds, who guides the Restorer through the memories. She claims that the project is on the brink of losing its funding, and that Jean's case will either make or break the future of the Institute.

Once inside the patient's mind, the Restorer makes their way through the patient's childhood memories of Pinwheel, a seaside village in England which relies heavily on tin and iron mining. Throughout the journey, the Restorer learns about the village's residents, a terrible accident in the mines that cost the lives of dozens of its citizens, and Jean's growing relationship with a boy named Thomas, whom she later marries. While rebuilding the memories, the Restorer encounters a gem-like stone, representing the dementia they are attempting to rid the patient's mind of. They must destroy the stones using the "Artifact", a lamp capable of erasing the dementia from the mind.

The patient's mind becomes more and more unstable as the process continues, and it is revealed through a series of flashbacks and revelations that the Restorer is actually Thomas. It is also revealed that he is not inside Jean's mind, but his own, trying to cure himself of his own dementia. Thomas had worked with Jean's father in the mines, and while Thomas managed to escape the deadly collapse, the father did not, leaving him riddled with guilt. Thomas' worsening condition and Jean's subsequent passing lead to Thomas creating his own fantasy world. Their son, Jim, had admitted him into a memory therapy clinic, where Dr. Edmunds had been working to bring his memories back and stop the dementia from progressing. With her help, and his memory of Jean encouraging him, he travels through the memories of his traumatic childhood in which his mother left his alcoholic father (who later dies in an accident at home), and is able to release himself from his fantasy world, curing his dementia and making the project a success. Afterward, Thomas is released to Jim's care, and thanks Dr. Edmunds for all her help.

Development
The game was developed by a 6-person team at White Paper Games, based in Manchester. Ether One was influenced by the studio's desire for "rich, narrative experiences" and game designer Pete Bottomley's goal to tell a story that he "could invest [himself] in". Regarding the game's portrayal of dementia, Bottomley stated that the team did not aim to necessarily raise awareness of the disease, but rather "open the conversation" and put the player in the perspective of someone suffering from it. Many members of the development team had family members that struggled with dementia.

Ether One is the studio's first game, and took around three years to create. Sound composer Nathaniel- Jorden Apostol composed the soundtrack for the game, which was later offered for sale on Bandcamp. Bottomley found it difficult "trying to build a studio" as well as a game at the same time. Bottomley and the team had to "carefully balance" the player's awareness of the character and the rules that bound gameplay, writing that it "wouldn't be fair" on the player to spend time solving puzzles if one could break at any time. The development team, during promotion for their next game The Occupation, stated that they "learnt a lot" from the production of Ether One. The two games are set in the same universe. A Mac version of the game was planned, but shelved due to performance issues.

PlayStation 4 edition and Redux
On 14 August 2014, White Paper Games announced a PlayStation 4 edition of Ether One. The company also announced that the PlayStation 4 edition would be rebuilt from scratch in Unreal Engine 4. Bottomley ruled out a possible Xbox One port, saying:

The change in game engines and consoles brought a number of technical challenges for White Paper Games. Apostol said that the "realisation" that the game would have to be rebuilt in a new game engine was a "really exciting" prospect for the studio. The company received support from the creators of Unreal Engine 4, Epic Games. Apostol was confident that those that had played the PC version would "love it on PS4 just the same". He also announced that the PC version would be ported to Unreal Engine 4 in a later update once they had fixed the "console specific stuff".

The game was released to PlayStation Plus subscribers for free as part of the "Instant Game Collection" on 5 May 2015. Sony approached White Paper Games regarding the deal, an event that Apostol called "a dream come true". The game also received a retail release on Blu-ray Disc in September, in both standard and "steel case" editions.

In October 2015, White Paper Games released Ether One Redux for free to all users that had previously purchased Ether One on Steam. The update featured little gameplay and narrative changes, but updated the gameplay engine to Unreal Engine 4 for added graphical fidelity and parity with the PlayStation 4 port. The update also added French, German, Spanish, Italian and Polish subtitles.

Reception

Ether One received positive reviews from critics. Aggregating review website GameRankings gave the PC and PS4 versions 82% and 72% respectively, while Metacritic gave the PC and PS4 versions 82/100 and 75/100 respectively.

Several reviewers praised the atmosphere and immersion of the game. Sam Prell of Joystiq praised the environment, writing that the uninhabited dreamscapes feel "almost haunted", and praising the "constant, pervasive" aura of tension. He also favourably compared the game to the 1939 classic The Wizard of Oz. Kotaku called Ether One "very much a '90s adventure game". Richard Cobbett of IGN praised the way the game sets up a "hauntingly cryptic atmosphere", slowly opening up the town of Pinwheel for exploration.

The narrative of the game divided critics. IGN's Cobbett felt that the story was fragmented and confusingly told, but in a way that feels appropriate for the dementia plot at its core and the revelations that unfold. PC Gamer's Angus Morrison described the narrative as "tragic [...] a saga of dementia, death and industrial decline that is discovered rather than told". Morrison, however, criticised the ending, calling it unnecessary. Joystiq's Prell offered both praise and criticism for the story, complaining that plot threads were dropped often, but adding that despite its convoluted structure, the plot was cohesive enough to "make players emphaphetic to the Restorer's plight". Chris Priestman of Kill Screen praised the story, calling it "very Dickensian". John Walker of Rock Paper Shotgun said the puzzles started off fulfilling and grounded, but became more obtuse and dull as the game continued. The game's lack of violence (in comparison to other games of the era) was praised by Steven Hansen of Destructoid, who stated that "There's been blowback against first-person games that don't feature a gun or at least a sharpened tooth brush. Anything to harm someone with. While exploratory and firearm free, Ether One isn't exactly in line with The Stanley Parable or Gone Home. Not entirely, anyway." GameCrate's Robert Workman criticised the slow pace of certain puzzles, saying that in an attempt to present a sense of vastness, some puzzles have been paced out to the point of frustration. He also derided the lack of a hint system.

Several reviewers favourably compared the game to 1993 puzzle game Myst. PC Gamer's Morrison said that Ether One's challenges were less challenging than Myst's, saying that "[...] when Ether One has you stumped, you're missing the obvious. For an adventure puzzle game that's the Holy Grail". Game Revolution's review stated that Ether One was closer to Myst in style and execution than any other game.

Depiction of dementia
Ether One has been praised for its portrayal of dementia. Push Square's Joey Thurmond praised the game for educating players about the condition while still being entertaining. Michael Thomsen, in a piece for The New Yorker, praised the system's encouraging of "hoarding" and this mechanic's effective simulation of the cognitive degradation of dementia. Destructoids Steven Hansen also praised the simulation, stating that the game takes "a sort of reverse Eternal Sunshine of the Spotless Mind approach".

References

External links
 
 

2014 video games
First-person adventure games
PlayStation 4 games
Single-player video games
Unreal Engine games
Video games about mental health
Video games about old age
Video games developed in the United Kingdom
Video games set in England
Windows games
White Paper Games games